The 2002 Premier League speedway season was the second division of speedway in the United Kingdom and governed by the Speedway Control Board (SCB), in conjunction with the British Speedway Promoters' Association (BSPA).

Season summary
The League consisted of 17 teams for the 2002 season with the addition of two teams, the Rye House Rockets and the Somerset Rebels from the Conference League. 

The League was run on a standard format with no play-offs and was won by Sheffield Tigers.

On 14 April, Lawrence Hare was paralysed after crashing while riding for Exeter Falcons.

Final table

Premier League Knockout Cup
The 2002 Premier League Knockout Cup was the 35th edition of the Knockout Cup for tier two teams. Sheffield Tigers  were the winners of the competition.

First round

Second round

Quarter-finals

Semi-finals

Final
First leg

Second leg

Sheffield were declared Knockout Cup Champions, winning on aggregate 97–83.

Final leading averages

Riders & final averages
Arena Essex

Leigh Lanham 9.19
Kelvin Tatum 8.48
Shaun Tacey 7.30
Colin White 7.24
Lee Herne 4.78
Andy Galvin 3.79
Carl Baldwin 3.37
Scott Courtney 2.67

Berwick

Paul Bentley 9.24
Claus Kristensen 7.79 
Michal Makovský 7.50
Adrian Rymel 6.99
Simon Cartwright 6.65
Kevin Doolan 6.29
Steffen Mell 5.06

Edinburgh

Peter Carr 9.17 
Frede Schott 8.20 
Daniel Andersson 7.36 
Magnus Karlsson 7.00
Theo Pijper 5.85
Aidan Collins 5.72
Rory Schlein 5.52
Christian Henry 4.92
David Meldrum 4.27
Ben Shields 3.41

Exeter

Seemond Stephens 8.46
Michael Coles 8.34
Mark Simmonds 7.78 
Roger Lobb 7.52
Lawrence Hare 6.92
Krister Marsh 6.58
Bobby Eldridge 5.52
Jason Prynne 3.81
Matt Cambridge 3.34
Corey Blackman 2.53

Glasgow

George Štancl 9.04
James Grieves 8.08 
Mick Powell 7.75
Kenny Olsson 5.13
Martin Dixon 4.70
David McAllan 4.40
Grant MacDonald 3.17

Hull

Garry Stead 8.68
Robbie Kessler 8.33
Paul Thorp 8.08
Ross Brady 7.75
Jamie Smith 6.17
Emil Kramer 5.97
Lee Smethills 5.55
Craig Branney 1.91

Isle of Wight

Adam Shields 9.85
Ray Morton 9.53 
Danny Bird 8.28
Henning Bager 6.25
Sebastien Trésarrieu 6.20
Matt Read 5.76
Gary Phelps 5.21
Nick Simmons 3.92
Daniel Giffard 2.10

Newcastle

Kenneth Bjerre 8.61 
Andre Compton 8.33
Davey Watt 8.00
Kevin Little 6.98
Richard Juul 5.89
Derek Sneddon 5.69
Wayne Carter 4.95
Rob Grant Jr 3.74
Richard Hall 1.37

Newport

Craig Watson 8.94 
Frank Smart 8.91 
Scott Smith 6.85
Emil Lindqvist 6.75
Lee Dicken 6.04
Carl Wilkinson 4.31
Ashley Jones 3.13
Barrie Evans 2.74

Reading

Andrew Appleton 8.95 
Phil Morris 8.68
Dave Mullett 8.56
Anders Henriksson 7.54
Jason Bunyan 6.82
Paul Clews 5.96
Chris Schramm 4.32
Glen Phillips 4.29
Gavin Hedge 2.97

Rye House

Brent Werner 8.47
Nigel Sadler 8.11
Scott Robson 7.51
Mark Courtney 6.60
David Mason 5.39
Scott Swain 5.19
Troy Pratt 4.41
Adam Pryer 3.09
Chris Courage 2.80
Daniel Giffard 1.40

Sheffield

Sean Wilson 10.17 
Simon Stead 8.53 
Lee Complin 7.67 
Scott Smith 7.20
Andrew Moore 6.97
James Birkinshaw 6.12
Ricky Ashworth 4.94

Somerset

Marián Jirout 9.31
Glenn Cunningham 7.74
Neil Collins 6.89
Graeme Gordon 5.58
Steve Bishop 5.17
Adam Allott 4.37
David Meldrum 4.35
Malcolm Holloway 3.77
Gary Phelps 3.23
Stuart Williams 2.63
Shane McCabe 2.61

Stoke

Alan Mogridge 8.50
Jan Staechmann 8.48
Paul Pickering 7.90
Tony Atkin 6.14
Jon Armstrong 5.79
Mark Burrows 5.13
Will Beveridge 4.06
Rob Grant Jr. 4.00
Lee Hodgson 2.46

Swindon

Paul Fry 9.46
Charlie Gjedde 8.92 
Oliver Allen 8.30 
Chris Neath 6.47
Paul Lee 5.04
Adam Allott 5.02
Jason King 3.65
Ritchie Hawkins 3.34

Trelawny

Chris Harris 9.13
Alun Rossiter 7.27
Emiliano Sanchez 7.13
Steve Masters 6.98
Richard Wolff 6.95
Seemond Stephens 6.19
Pavel Ondrašík 5.88
Simon Phillips 4.39
Jason Prynne 2.51

Workington

Carl Stonehewer 10.08 
Peter I Karlsson 8.10
Les Collins 8.08
Rusty Harrison 7.65
Kauko Nieminen 6.20
Chris Collins 2.89
James Mann 2.87
Scott James 2.67
Lee Hodgson 2.24
Tom Brown 2.10
Shane Colvin 1.82

See also
List of United Kingdom Speedway League Champions
Knockout Cup (speedway)

References

Speedway Premier League
2002 in speedway
2002 in British motorsport